Kathryn White (born 27 July 1978) is a former Scottish international cricketer whose career for the Scottish national side spanned from 2001 to 2013. She had played 8 women's one-day internationals.

White was born at Stirling in 1978.

References

External links

1978 births
Living people
Cricketers from Stirling
Scotland women One Day International cricketers
Scottish women cricketers